Janice R. Coggeshall (1935 – June 19, 2017) was a mayor of Galveston, Texas.

Biography
Jan (Reddig) Coggeshall was born in 1935 in the state of New York. She was raised in Rochester, New York. After gaining a degree in Mathematics from Wellesley College in 1957, she followed her family to Galveston, Texas in 1971. She first engaged in public service with the League of Women Voters, and chaired the Design of the City Committee. Galvestonians elected Coggeshall for city council in 1979, her first elected position. Five years later, she was elected as the first female mayor of Galveston.

Coggeshall was a board member of the Galveston Ethics Board for two and a half decades, and she served for the same length of time on the Galveston Housing Finance Corporation. She volunteered for education groups, co-founding the Galveston College Foundation. She was a trustee for Galveston’s Rosenberg Library.

Coggeshall was married to Dr. Richard E. Coggeshall.

Coggeshall died of cancer on June 19, 2017.

References

;

1935 births
2017 deaths
Wellesley College alumni
Mayors of Galveston, Texas
Deaths from cancer in Texas